Bill Ramseyer (November 29, 1936 – February 18, 2021) was an American football coach, player of football and baseball, and college athletics administrator.

College Career
He served as the head football coach at Wilmington College in Wilmington, Ohio from 1972 to 1990 and at the University of Virginia's College at Wise from 1991 to 2001 compiling a career college football record of 176–104–4. Ramseyer led Wilmington to three NAIA playoff appearances in 1980, 1982 and 1983, reaching the Division II National Championship game in 1980. Ramseyer was inducted into both schools hall of fame.

Europe
In 2009-10, Ramseyer was head coach of the Winterthur Warriors in Switzerland Nationalliga A (American football). The Warriors reached the Swiss league playoffs semi final in 2009, losing to the Calanda Broncos. Randy Hippeard, Ramseyer's former star quarterback at Virginia-Wise was signed and was the Warriors starting QB in 2009-2010.

College Head coaching record

College football

References

1936 births
2021 deaths
Bluffton Beavers baseball coaches
Bluffton Beavers football coaches
Bluffton Beavers football players
Missouri Tigers football coaches
Virginia–Wise Cavaliers football coaches
Wilmington Quakers football coaches
Wilmington Quakers athletic directors
College men's track and field athletes in the United States
High school football coaches in Ohio
People from Bluffton, Ohio
Coaches of American football from Ohio
Players of American football from Ohio
Place of birth missing
Place of death missing
American expatriate players of American football